Oh Chang-seok (born 2 June 1982) is a South Korean actor. He is best known for his leading role in the 2013 television series Princess Aurora.

Personal life 
On July 2, 2019 Oh and model Lee Chae-eun confirmed their relationship when they took on the role of first pitcher and batter at a baseball game. The two began their relationship after appearing on the romance reality show “Taste of Dating”.

Filmography

Film

Television series

Television show

Awards and nominations

References

External links

 
 Oh Chang-seok at PF Entertainment
 

Living people
1982 births
South Korean male film actors
South Korean male television actors
South Korean male models
21st-century South Korean male actors